The 2020 IIHF World U18 Championship would have been the 22nd such event hosted by the International Ice Hockey Federation. Teams would have participated at several levels of competition. The competition also would have served as qualifications for the 2021 competition. The division II and III tournaments were cancelled by IIHF on 2 March 2020. The top division and division I tournaments were cancelled by the IIHF on 13 March 2020 due to the COVID-19 pandemic

Top Division
The tournament was to be held from 16 to 26 April 2020 in Plymouth and Ann Arbor, United States, but was cancelled by the IIHF.

Preliminary round
All times are local (UTC–4).

Group A

Group B

Division I

Group A
The tournament was to be held in Spišská Nová Ves, Slovakia from 13 to 19 April 2020, but was cancelled by the IIHF.

 – Promoted from Division I B

 – Relegated from Top Division

Group B
The tournament was to be held in Asiago, Italy from 12 to 18 April 2020, but was cancelled by the IIHF.

 – Promoted from Division II A

 – Relegated from Division I A

Division II

Group A
The tournament was to be held in Tallinn, Estonia from 22 to 28 March 2020, but was cancelled by the IIHF.
 – Relegated from Division I B

 – Promoted from Division II B

Group B
The tournament was to be held in Sofia, Bulgaria from 23 to 29 March 2020, but was cancelled by the IIHF.

 – Promoted from Division III A

 – Relegated from Division II A

Division III

Group A
The tournament was to be held in Istanbul, Turkey from 16 to 22 March 2020, but was cancelled by the IIHF.
 – Relegated from Division II B
 – Promoted from Division III B

Group B
The tournament was to be held in Kockelscheuer, Luxembourg from 29 March to 4 April 2020, but was cancelled by the IIHF.

 – Debut

 – Relegated from Division III A

References

 
IIHF World U18 Championships
IIHF World U18 Championships
IIHF World U18 Championships
2020
2019–20 in American ice hockey
Ice hockey competitions in Michigan
IIHF World U18 Championships
Sports in Ann Arbor, Michigan